Dominic is a male given name.

Dominic may also refer to:

Fiction
Dominic Flandry, a central character in Poul Anderson's Technic History science fiction
Dominic Fortune, a comic book character
Dominic Greene, a primary antagonist in the James Bond film Quantum of Solace
The Flipside of Dominick Hide, a time traveller in 1980 BBC play
Dominic Reilly, a character on the long-running British soap opera Hollyoaks
Dominic Santini, a character on the series Airwolf
Dominic Sorel, a character in the 2005–2006 anime and manga series Eureka Seven
Dominic Toretto, a character from The Fast and the Furious

Other
Operation Dominic I and II, a series of 105 nuclear test explosions conducted in 1962 and 1963 by the United States
Dominic system, a mnemonic system

See also

Dominica, a country
Dominique (disambiguation)
St Dominic (disambiguation)
St. Dominic's Church (disambiguation)